The quadratic assignment problem (QAP) is one of the fundamental combinatorial optimization problems in the branch of optimization or operations research in mathematics, from the category of the facilities location problems first introduced by Koopmans and Beckmann.

The problem models the following real-life problem:

There are a set of n facilities and a set of n locations. For each pair of locations, a distance is specified and for each pair of facilities a weight or flow is specified (e.g., the amount of supplies transported between the two facilities). The problem is to assign all facilities to different locations with the goal of minimizing the sum of the distances multiplied by the corresponding flows.

Intuitively, the cost function encourages facilities with high flows between each other to be placed close together.

The problem statement resembles that of the assignment problem, except that the cost function is expressed in terms of quadratic inequalities, hence the name.

Formal mathematical definition

The formal definition of the quadratic assignment problem is as follows:

Given two sets, P ("facilities") and L ("locations"), of equal size, together with a weight function w : P × P → R and a distance function d : L × L → R. Find the bijection f : P → L ("assignment") such that the cost function:

is minimized.

Usually  weight and distance functions are viewed as square real-valued matrices, so that the cost function is written down as:

In matrix notation:

Computational complexity 

The problem is NP-hard, so there is no known algorithm for solving this problem in polynomial time, and even small instances may require long computation time. It was also proven that the problem does not have an approximation algorithm running in polynomial time for any (constant) factor,  unless P = NP. The travelling salesman problem (TSP) may be seen as a special case of QAP if one assumes that the flows connect all facilities only along a single ring, all flows have the same non-zero (constant) value and all distances are equal to the respective distances of the TSP instance. Many other problems of standard combinatorial optimization problems may be written in this form.

Applications 

In addition to the original plant location formulation, QAP is a mathematical model for the problem of placement of interconnected electronic components onto a printed circuit board or on a microchip, which is part of the place and route stage of computer aided design in the electronics industry.

See also
Quadratic bottleneck assignment problem

References 
Notes

Sources
  A2.5: ND43, pg.218.

External links
 https://www.opt.math.tugraz.at/qaplib/ QAPLIB - A Quadratic Assignment Problem Library
 http://www.wiomax.com/team/xie/maos-qap-quadratic-assignment-problem-project-portal/  MAOS-QAP - Java-based Quadratic Assignment Problem Solver
 https://CRAN.R-project.org/package=qap - R package qap: Heuristics for the Quadratic Assignment Problem
 https://apps.microsoft.com/store/detail/qapsolver/9N7WMCFB6NZZ - Metaheuristic QAP solver for Windows 10/11

NP-hard problems
Combinatorial optimization